Talab Tillo is a suburban area of Jammu City in the Indian union territory of Jammu and Kashmir and is situated in Jammu Province. It derived its name from a saint named 'Tilloo' and from a "Talab" which was situated here. "Talab" is a Hindi word which means "Pond" in English. Earlier it was used to be called as 'Tillo Talab' but now with the passage of time the name is changed to 'Talab Tillo'. Residents of the area are fluent in Hindi, Kashmiri, Dogri and Urdu. It consists of other Minor areas - 
1) Udheywala
2) Anand Nagar
3) Talab Tillo Chowk
4) Golepully
5) Pacca Gharat

See also
 Jammu
 Jammu Tawi
 Nagrota
 Samba, Jammu
 Kathua
 Jammu Cantonment
 Hiranagar
 Akhnoor
 Sopore

References

External links 
 Page purporting to show the location of Talab Tillo

Jammu Division